A khol is a double-headed clay drum of eastern India.

Khol may also refer to:
 KHOL, a radio station in Jackson Hole, Wyoming, United States
 KHOL-TV, a television station in Kearney, Nebraska, United States
 Lakhon Khol, a Cambodian masked dance

People with the surname
 Andreas Khol (born 1941), Austrian politician

See also
 
 Kohl (disambiguation)